The American Can Company Building, now known as the American Can Lofts, is a historic former factory in the Northside neighborhood of Cincinnati, Ohio, United States. Built by the American Can Company, the factory was used to manufacture can-making machines, rather than producing the cans itself; it remained in operation until closure in 1963. Two years later, it was reopened by the Cleveland Machine Company, which used its first floor for machining purposes; after their departure in 1978, it sat almost totally unused, with the only exceptions being small businesses such as T-shirt printers and warehouse operators.

In late 2005, a local redevelopment company purchased the American Can Company Building, using a $500,000 loan from the city's community development office.  Expecting to have to pay another $800,000 to resolve longstanding environmental issues at the property, the company received a grant of $750,000 from the Clean Ohio Assistance Fund.  As this process was a significant component of a larger redevelopment project on the eastern portion of Northside, the American Can owners sought to renovate their property in a manner compatible with its historic nature.  In 2006, the building was assessed against the guidelines of the National Register of Historic Places, a federal historic preservation program, and found to be eligible for inclusion on the Register.  Besides starting the National Register nomination process, the owners applied for the building to be designated a historic site by Cincinnati's city planning commission; such approval was granted in July 2007.  Three months later, the National Park Service added the building to the Register.

Redevelopment
The owners' ultimate goal was to convert the property into apartments and small shops. With renovations nearly complete, the building reopened as American Can Lofts in September, 2011.

References

External links 

 American Can Lofts web site

Apartment buildings in Cincinnati
Buildings and structures completed in 1921
Manufacturing plants in the United States
National Register of Historic Places in Cincinnati
Building
Cincinnati Local Historic Landmarks